Ümit Korkmaz (born 17 September 1985) is an Austrian footballer who plays as a winger for Ostbahn XI.

Club career
Korkmaz was signed by a fifth division club at the age of 18. He was soon discovered by scouts of Rapid Wien and transferred to the club. Brought through the ranks of Rapid Wien, Korkmaz played two seasons with the side.

In June 2008, Korkmaz agreed to join German Bundesliga side Eintracht Frankfurt. He signed a four-year contract that runs until 30 June 2012. In January 2011, Eintracht Frankfurt loaned Korkmaz, who had not had many chances to play for the club that season, to 2. Bundesliga club VfL Bochum.

On 12 December 2013, it was announced that he had annulled his contract with FC Ingolstadt 04 and would subsequently join Çaykur Rizespor.

Korkmaz signed with First Vienna on 20 December 2018.

International career
He received his first call-up for Austria in summer 2007 but only made his debut prior to Euro 2008. He was also included in the 23-man squad for the tournament.

Personal life
Korkmaz is of Turkish descent. He also holds Turkish citizenship, which made him eligible to play internationally for the Turkey national team.

Honours
Rapid Wien
 Austrian Football Bundesliga: 2007–08

References

External links
 
 
 
 
 
 Ümit Korkmaz at ÖFB

1985 births
Living people
Footballers from Vienna
Austrian people of Turkish descent
Turkish footballers
Austrian footballers
Association football wingers
Austria international footballers
UEFA Euro 2008 players
Austrian Football Bundesliga players
Bundesliga players
2. Bundesliga players
Süper Lig players
SK Rapid Wien players
Eintracht Frankfurt players
VfL Bochum players
FC Ingolstadt 04 players
Çaykur Rizespor footballers
SKN St. Pölten players
FC Mauerwerk players
First Vienna FC players
SC Ostbahn XI players
Turkish expatriate footballers
Austrian expatriate footballers
Turkish expatriate sportspeople in Germany
Austrian expatriate sportspeople in Germany
Expatriate footballers in Germany